Jönköping University (JU), formerly Högskolan i Jönköping, is a non-governmental Swedish university college located in the city Jönköping in Småland, Sweden.

JU is a member of the European University Association (EUA) and The Association of Swedish Higher Education, SUHF.

Organization 
JU is one of three Swedish private institutions of higher education with the right to award doctoral degrees in certain areas such as social sciences. JU operates on the basis of an agreement with the Government of Sweden and conforms to national degree regulations and quality requirements. The university is organized as a corporate group with non-profit JU Foundation as the parent organization and six wholly owned subsidiaries: the School of Health and Welfare, the School of Education and Communication, Jönköping International Business School, the School of Engineering, Jönköping University Enterprise and University Services. The University Services provide provides services such as study administration, studies and career guidance, IT service, care taker's office, communication and marketing as well as accounting and human resource administration.

Name 
The university titles itself as Jönköping University in official Swedish texts, a decision which met criticism in Sweden, in part as it was perceived as an attempt to profile the college as having full university status. The name change was reported in 2016 by the Swedish Language Council (Språkrådet) to the Parliamentary Ombudsman (Justitieombudsman), which chose not to set the matter to trial. The university responded with a statement that it was not out of the ordinary in an international context to profile itself as University. However, this has been seen by some as a way to engage in deceptive marketing and a way to give the school a higher status. This is due to the fact that university colleges are, sometime but not always, limited when it comes to which specific areas of academia it is possible for students to pursue a PhD in at the particular school.

Schools 

JU conducts research and offers preparatory programmes, undergraduate studies, graduate studies, doctoral studies and contract education through the following subsidiaries: 
 Jönköping International Business School (JIBS)
 School of Education and Communication
 Jönköping School of Engineering
 School of Health and Welfare
 Jönköping University Enterprise (Primarily Pathway programmes, designed for international students)

Campus 
The JU Campus is situated in the city centre of Jönköping, on the western shore of the lake Munksjön and not far from the south shore of the lake Vättern, about five minutes walk from the Central Station.

History 

1897: The first nursing students received their degree qualifications in Jönköping by Jönköping County.

1947: An elementary-school teachers' training college was established in Jönköping.

1963: A pre-school teachers' training college started in Jönköping.

1968: The elementary-school teachers' training college becomes "Jönköping Teacher School" and moves house to Västra Torget. The county's central school for the caring profession moves to new premises on Munksjö beach and in 1971 changes its name to "Munksjö School".

1970: The Institute for Gerontology and the "Ortos" Laboratory were started by Jönköping County, they later became part of the School of Health Sciences.

1975: Higher Vocational Education started in Jönköping.

1977: Reform of Swedish higher education. Jönköping University College is set up as a state university college. The "Jönköping Teacher School" and the pre-school teachers' training college merged into the university. A two-year economic education started, become three-year in 1978. The Communication Officer (Informatör) programme started this year, it later became the Media and Communication programme. Some of the caring programmes at the Munksjö School become university programmes.

1979: First international student exchange; teacher training in Liverpool.

1981: Single subject courses relocated to the municipalities in the county.

1983: The Munksjö School starts a Prosthetics and Orthotics programme, focus: orthopedic technician, which is still now the only in its kind in Sweden.

1987: The Munksjö School's university educations within the health sector are renamed the School of Health Sciences.

1988: First engineering programme starts at Jönköping University College.

1994: Jönköping University Foundation was founded, with three schools; the School of Education and Communication, the School of Engineering and Jönköping International Business School as well as University Services. A joint faculty for the three schools is founded and the first right to award master's degrees are given to Jönköping University. Host company activities start at Jönköping International Business School and the School of Engineering.

1995: Jönköping University is given the right to award doctorates in four business school subjects. Research education is started at Jönköping International Business School.

1996: The first professors' inauguration at Jönköping University. Organized support for student business ventures is started by two students.

1997: The new campus is opened (Stage I) which includes the President's Office, Jönköping International Business School and University Services. In 1998 the School of Engineering moves to campus. First doctoral thesis defence. 1999: First conferment of doctoral degree at Jönköping University. The School of Health Sciences is given the right to award degrees in Social Science.

2000: The School of Education and Communication's new building stands ready (Stage II).

2001: Education in vocational education is started at the School of Education and Communication. Science Park Jönköping opens near the university and takes over, among other things, the support of student enterprises.

2002: The School of Health Sciences becomes the fourth school within Jönköping University. The Students' House is opened.

2004: The university is given the right to award doctorates within the  Humanities and Social Sciences. First international scientific magazine published in Jönköping, the Journal of Media Business Studies.

2005: The University Library is named Library of the Year in Sweden.

2007: 1 January 2007 Ingenjörshögskolan (the School of Engineering) is reorganized as Tekniska Högskolan i Jönköping (JTH). The name is not changed in English. A long-term collaboration with Chalmers and KTH (The Royal Institute of Technology) is set up.

2010: The university is given the right to award Licentiate and Doctoral Degrees in Engineering, research area: Industrial Production, Machine design, Material and manufacturing processes, and Production systems.

2011: The first fee-paying international students from countries outside the EU/EEA are welcomed to Jönköping University.

2013: The university's sports centre, Campus Arena, is inaugurated.

2015: As the first business faculty in Sweden, Jönköping International Business School received both AACSB and EQUIS accreditation.

Education 
Jönköping University offers courses and study programmes taught in Swedish and in English. Education is within the fields of health, nursing, social work, education, media and communication studies, technology, science and engineering as well as economics, law and informatics.
Jönköping University offers courses and study programmes taught in English on all three levels: Bachelor, Master and Doctoral.
Jönköping University Enterprise focuses on providing preparatory education for higher studies through Pathway Programmes.

Educator Center for Academic Teaching and Learning 
In 2022, Jönköping University established a new center for academic teaching and learning in higher education, through President's Decision § 958. The center's mission and aim is to "drive forward the development of academic teaching and learning at Jönköping University in a number of ways: the Educate website; ongoing consultancy; courses, seminars and workshops; teaching labs; and as a point of contact for international, national and regional partners at JU in the field of teaching and learning in higher education." The center name is Educator Center for Academic Teaching and Learning, abbreviated as the acronym EDUCATE. It is the first time faculty at Jönköping University can access courses, seminars, workshops and professional guidance from a common, shared, resource between the individual schools at Jönköping University. Previously, access to courses in pedagogy for higher education has been organized by the School of Education and Communication.
In late 2022, EDUCATE launched an external website to enable easy access to services for staff and faculty, as well as external users.

Accreditations
Jönköping International Business School is accredited by EQUIS (European Quality Improvement System) and AACSB since 2015. It is the only institution in Sweden that holds both accreditations.

Doctoral programmes 
Jönköping University has around 200 doctoral students as of 2019. The four doctoral programmes at Jönköping International Business School are called Business Administration, Economics, Informatics and Statistics. The doctoral programmes at the School of Education and Communication lead to a doctoral degree the following subjects: Education, Disability Research, Media and Communication Science, Education with Specialisation in Didactics and Education with Specialisation in Special Education. The doctoral programmes at the School of Engineering all have an individual syllabus for every student and fall into the following areas: Machine Design, Materials and Manufacturing, and Production Systems. The doctoral programmes at the Research School of Health and Welfare approach the following subjects: Health and Care Sciences, Welfare and Social Sciences, and Disability Research.

Research 
The university is entitled to issue licentiate and doctoral degrees in the disciplinary research domain of humanities and social sciences. Within technology, the university can issue licentiate and doctoral degrees in the field of industrial product development. Focus for research is entrepreneurship, ownership and business renewal, technical expertise and know-how to small- and medium-sized enterprises, the conditions for education and communication, and health, care and social work from a unique holistic perspective.

Jönköping University's first full professors were inaugurated in 1996, and the first PhDs were conferred in 2000.

Research centres and institutes 

Jönköping International Business School:
 Centre for Family Entrepreneurship and Ownership (CeFEO)
 Centre for Entrepreneurship and Spatial Economics (CEnSE)
 Media Management and Transformation Centre (MMT Centre)

School of Education and Communication:
 CHILD - Children, Health, Intervention, Learning and Development (with the School of Health and Welfare)
 Lifelong Learning
 Encell - National Centre for Lifelong Learning
 Media and Communication Science
 LPS - Learning Practices inside and outside School
 Practice based Educational Research 
 Superintendents Institute
 LeaDMe - Learning, Digitalization, and Media

School of Engineering:
 Product and Production Development
 Materials and Manufacturing
 Supply Chain and Operations Management
 Computer Science and Informatics
 Mathematics and Physics
 Construction Engineering and Lighting Science
 CIC - Casting Innovation Centreexternal link, opens in new window

School of Health Sciences:
 The Jönköping Academy for Improvement of Health and Welfare
 A.D.U.L.T. - Activity, Daily-life, Utility, Life-style and Transition
 ARN-J - Aging Research Network - Jönköping
 CHILD - Children, Health, Intervention, Learning and Development (with School of Education and Communication)
 SALVE - Social Work, Actors, Living conditions and research VEnue
 Improvement, innovation and leadership in health and welfare
 Biomedical Platform
 Centre for Oral Health
 Prosthetics and Orthotics

Honorary doctors

Science Park Jönköping 
JU is partner of and strongly engaged in the development of Science Park Jönköping which provides support for the start-up, development and growth of business ventures. Science Park Jönköping is a member of SiSP- Swedish Incubators and Science Parks

Student life

Jönköping Student Union (JSU) 
JU has mandatory Student Union membership, which was decided by the university. Exceptions from this rule are the PhD students and students not studying at university level (preparatory programmes). The Student Union works with the four Student Associations from each faculty:
 LOK - School of Education and Communication
 HI-TECH - Jönköping School of Engineering
 Hälsosektion - School of Health and Welfare
 JIBS Student Association (JSA) - Jönköping International Business School

The Student Union works on the following areas: Monitoring of education quality, Student welfare issues, Integration, Student health, Housing issues and Services.

The Student Union has one annual meeting (Swedish: årsmöte) per year and it is the highest decision-making body of the union. During the annual meeting students elect representatives as well as votes on budget, goals, strategies and visions for the next fiscal year. Two of the elected representatives work in the Student Union full time as the presidium. The student associations have their own meetings to elect local representatives and vote on their budgets, goals, strategies and visions.

Student activities 
The Student Union has a nightclub called Akademien, which translates to The Academy. It is exclusively for JU students, with the exception of students from other higher education institutions if they are admitted to a guest list. The Student Union also hosts the following activities over the year: Trips, Language Café,  After School and Culture Day. The Student Union also plans and executes the Kick Off along with the university and the Student Associations. The Kick-off takes place in the start of the autumn semester for ten days, and the spring semester for five days. There are also JSU associations based on interests.

Student boilersuit 
The university students are part of the Swedish culture of the Student boilersuit. Different Student Associations, the Student Union employees and one student association have different colours on the boilersuit

See also 
List of colleges and universities in Sweden
University of Gothenburg
Lund University
Stockholm University
Uppsala University

References

External links 
 Jönköping University - Official site
 Jönköping University Library
 Jönköping Student Union
 Science Park Jönköping

Jönköping
University Foundation
Educational institutions established in 1994
Private universities and colleges in Europe
1994 establishments in Sweden